Krokhalevo is a rural locality (a village) in Gorodetskoye Rural Settlement, Kichmengsko-Gorodetsky District, Vologda Oblast, Russia. The population was 70 as of 2002.

Geography 
Krokhalevo is located 2 km east of Kichmengsky Gorodok (the district's administrative centre) by road. Kichmengsky Gorodok is the nearest rural locality.

References 

Rural localities in Kichmengsko-Gorodetsky District